The Fallone Nunataks are a chain of nunataks  long, located 10 nautical miles northeast of the Harold Byrd Mountains, between the edge of the Ross Ice Shelf and the Watson Escarpment. They were named by the Advisory Committee on Antarctic Names for Lieutenant Paul R. Fallone, Jr., U.S. Navy, aide to the Commander, U.S. Naval Support Force, Antarctica, 1962.

References 

Nunataks of Marie Byrd Land